Richard Mosley is a Canadian Federal Court trial judge, who has a background in National security interests, and has taken a role in hearing a number of Canadian anti-terrorism cases, including those relating to Abdullah and Omar Khadr, as well as Hassan Almrei. He has also taken a role in hearing the case of Jeremy Hinzman.

References

People from Sault Ste. Marie, Ontario
Living people
Judges of the Federal Court of Canada
1949 births